GM Abdul Haq is a Bangladesh Nationalist Party politician and a Member of Parliament from Shatkhira-5.

Career
Haq was elected to parliament from Shatkhira-5 as an Bangladesh Nationalist Party candidate in February 1996.

References

Bangladesh Nationalist Party politicians
Date of birth missing (living people)
6th Jatiya Sangsad members